Luzia may refer to:

People 
 Luzia Bezerra (born 1968), Angolan handball player
 Luzia Ebnöther (born 1971), Swiss curler
 Luzia Hartsuyker-Curjel (1926–2011), Dutch architect
 Luzia Premoli (born 1955), Brazilian nun
 Luzia Simão (born 1992), Angolan basketball player
 Luzia Inglês Van-Dúnem (born 1948), Angolan politician
 Luzia von Wyl (born 1985), Swiss jazz pianist and composer
 Luzia Zberg (born 1970), Swiss cyclist

Other uses 
 Luzia Woman, the skeletal remains of a prehistoric woman found in a cave in Brazil
 Luzia (Cirque du Soleil), a circus show by Cirque du Soleil
 Luzia (album)
 Luzia, a supporter of the 19th-century Liberal Party of Brazil

See also
 Santa Luzia (disambiguation)
 Lutzia
 Lusia (disambiguation)
 Lucia (disambiguation)
 Lucy (disambiguation)